The Chrysler Pronto Cruizer was a concept car designed by Bryan Nesbitt for Chrysler—a design that ultimately evolved into the Chrysler PT Cruiser.

Overview
The Pronto Cruizer debuted at the 1999 Geneva Auto Show as a possible Plymouth model—as with other "Pronto" concepts, the 1997 Plymouth Pronto and 1998 Plymouth Pronto Spyder. The Pronto Cruizer became a Chrysler due to the planned discontinuation of the Plymouth marque.

The vehicle carries a 1.6 L I4 engine with a five-speed manual transmission borrowed from the second generation Dodge/Plymouth Neon. The design was also derived from the Neon, but with elements borrowed from another DaimlerChrysler concept car, the Plymouth Pronto. The Pronto Cruizer has a grille and fenders that similar the one used on the Plymouth Prowler. A roll-back fabric top was used on the Pronto Cruizer as well.

Maisto diecast models
The Pronto Cruizer was recreated as a scale model by Maisto, reproduced first as a 1:18 scale model with an Aztec Yellow paint job. Later, a 1:64 scale model of the Pronto Cruizer was released in Aztec Yellow along with two Marvel superhero-themed liveries of The Incredible Hulk and Spider-Man.

See also
 Chrysler PT Cruiser
 Dodge/Plymouth Neon
 Plymouth Prowler

References

External links
 Ritz Site - AutoRAI - Pronto Cruizer
 AutoWeb - Chrysler "Pronto Cruizer" Concept Car for Geneva
 Chrysler Pronto Cruizer | Chrysler | Model Car

Pronto Cruizer
Retro-style automobiles